Dieter Moebius (16 January 1944 – 20 July 2015) was a Swiss-born German electronic musician and composer, best known as a member of the influential krautrock bands Cluster and Harmonia.

Moebius was studying art at Berlin's Akademie Grafik and working as a restaurant cook when he met Conrad Schnitzler, founder of the Zodiak Free Arts Lab with Hans-Joachim Roedelius. The trio founded the improv group Kluster in 1969. After the departure of Schnitzler, the duo changed their name to Cluster and relocated to the countryside village of Forst, releasing influential albums such as Zuckerzeit (1974) and Sowiesoso (1976). Moebius would also draw on his graphic design training create the cover artwork for various Cluster albums and related collaborations.

Meanwhile, Moebius and Roedelius founded the band Harmonia with Michael Rother of Neu!, releasing the albums Musik von Harmonia (1974) and Deluxe (1975). Admirer Brian Eno would subsequently collaborate with both groups. Moebius began recording solo works in the 1970s and was later involved in numerous side-projects with such musicians as Conny Plank and Mani Neumeier (Guru Guru), including the influential 1983 album Zero Set.

Moebius toured with Rother as Rother & Moebius in 2007. Additionally, on 27 November 2007, a Harmonia reunion concert was held in Haus der Kulturen der Welt, Berlin, where the band performed together live for the first time since 1976. He died of cancer on 20 July 2015.

Discography
Solo albums and collaborations
 1980 Rastakraut Pasta (with Conny Plank)
 1981 Material (with Conny Plank)
 1981 Strange Music (with Gerd Beerbohm)
 1982 Zero Set (with Conny Plank and Mani Neumeier)
 1983 Tonspuren 
 1983 Double Cut (with Gerd Beerbohm)
 1986 Blue Moon (Original Soundtrack) 
 1990 Ersatz (with Karl Renziehausen)
 1992 Ersatz II (with Karl Renziehausen)
 1995 En Route (with Conny Plank; recorded in 1986, additional mix in 1995)
 1998 Ludwig's Law (with Conny Plank and Mayo Thompson)
 1999 Blotch 
 2002 Live in Japan (with Mani Neumeier)
 2006 Nurton 
 2007 Zero Set II (with Mani Neumeier)
 2009 Kram
 2011 Ding 
 2012 Moebius & Tietchens (with Asmus Tietchens)
 2014 Snowghost Pieces (Moebius, Story, Leidecker)
 2014 Nidemonex
Posthumous albums
 2017 Musik Für Metropolis
 2017 Familiar (Moebius, Story, Leidecker)
 2017 Kunsthalle Düsseldorf (Live) (12") (Moebius, Schneider)
 2019 Objective Objects (Dieter Moebius & Dwight Ashley)

As Kluster / Cluster
See Kluster and Cluster

With Brian Eno and Hans-Joachim Roedelius
1977 : Cluster & Eno
1978 : After the Heat

As Harmonia, with Michael Rother and Hans-Joachim Roedelius
1973 : Musik Von Harmonia
1975 : Deluxe
1997 : Tracks and Traces (recorded 1976 with Brian Eno)
2007 : Live 1974

As Cosmic Couriers, with Mani Neumeier and Jürgen Engler
1996 : Other Places
2014 : Another Other Places

With Liliental
 1978 Liliental

Source:

References

External links

1944 births
2015 deaths
Deaths from cancer in Germany
Ambient musicians
Krautrock
Swiss rock musicians